Yūya Uchida may refer to:
 Yuya Uchida (singer) (1939–2019), Japanese singer and actor
 Yūya Uchida (voice actor) (born 1965), Japanese voice actor